The GAIN domain (G-protein-coupled receptor (GPCR) autoproteolysis-inducing domain) is a protein domain found in a number of cell surface receptors, including adhesion-GPCRs and polycystic kidney disease proteins PKD1 and PKD2. The domain is involved in the self-cleavage of these transmembrane receptors, and has been shown to be crucial for their function . Point mutations within the GAIN domain of PKD1 and GPR56 are known to cause polycystic kidney disease and polymicrogyria, respectively.

References

Protein domains
Receptors
Cell adhesion proteins
G protein-coupled receptors
Cell signaling
Signal transduction